A Difficult Woman is an Australian television series which screened in 1998 on the ABC. The three part series starred Caroline Goodall, in the title role of a woman whose best friend is murdered and is determined to find out why. It was written by Nicholas Hammond and Steven Vidler and directed by Tony Tilse. The version screened on Acorn TV in the U.S. in 2020 was a four part series.

Cast
 Caroline Goodall as  Dr. Anne Harriman 
 Peter Feeney as Dave Gutteridge
 Martin Jacobs as Tom Ferrars
 Nicholas Eadie as Peter MacFarlane
 Jim Moriarty as Dominic Martin
 Bill Hunter as Paul Scanlon
 Anna Lise Phillips as Cassie
 Sarah Kants as Penny Ferrars
 Tara Morice as Susan Taylor
 Bille Brown as Howard
 Julia Blake as Mrs. McKenzie
 Victoria Longley as Giselle McKenzie

See also 
 List of Australian television series

References

External links
A Difficult Woman at IMDb
 A Difficult Woman at the Australian Television Information Archive

Australian adventure television series
1998 Australian television series debuts
1998 Australian television series endings
Australian Broadcasting Corporation original programming